The South Korea national korfball team is managed by the Korea Korfball Federation (KKF), representing Korea in korfball international competitions.

Tournament history

Current squad
National team in the 2014 Asia-Oceania Championship

 Coach: Huang Ying-Che, Kim Daechul

References 

Korea, South
Korfball
National team